Pedro Luis Beltrán García (born June 29, 1988) is a Mexican former professional footballer who played as a midfielder.

References
 
 http://www.ascensomx.net/cancha/jugador/46586/eyJpZENsdWIiOiAxMDczNH0= 

1988 births
Living people
Sportspeople from Culiacán
Footballers from Sinaloa
Mexican footballers
Association football midfielders
Murciélagos FC footballers
Liga MX players